An Alabama slammer is a cocktail made with amaretto, Southern Comfort, sloe gin, and orange juice. It is served in a Collins glass. It is also sometimes known as a southern slammer. It is claimed to have been made famous by quarterback Brett Favre; however, this drink was popular with college crowds as early as the 1980s, when it was served as a shaker shot in many bars and was also available as a "pitcher" in T.G.I. Friday's and other chain restaurants.

History
References to the Alabama slammer appear as early as Playboy Bartender's Guide by Thomas Mario in 1971.

ALABAMA SLAMMER 1 oz. Southern Comfort, ½ oz. sloe gin, 1 oz. amaretto, ½ oz. orange juice. Pour into a highball glass over rocks. Stir.

See also
List of cocktails

References

Cocktails with gin
Cocktails with liqueur
Cocktails
Cocktails with orange juice
Cocktails with Southern Comfort